Henry Selden may refer to:

 Henry R. Selden (1805–1885), American lawyer and politician
 Henry Raymond Selden (1821–1865), U.S. Army and Union Army officer